Yucca is an unincorporated community and census-designated place (CDP) in Mohave County, Arizona, United States. As of the 2020 census it had a population of 96, down from 126 at the 2010 census.

Located along Interstate 40, it lies southwest of Kingman, just east of the southern section of the Black Mountains and west of the Hualapai and McCracken Mountains in the Sacramento Valley. Yucca has a ZIP Code of 86438. Students in Yucca attend elementary school in the one-school Yucca School District, and high school in the Kingman Unified School District.

History 
Yucca started as an order office and water fill station for the Atlantic and Pacific Railroad (affiliated with the Atchison, Topeka and Santa Fe Railway) in the 1880s. It was part of a rail line commissioned by the U.S. Congress running from St. Louis, Missouri, to Needles, California. This rail line grew to be transcontinental and is a major freight corridor to Southern California. In 1918 Yucca started its own cemetery.

During World War II, the United States Army Air Forces purchased  of land and developed the Yucca Army Airfield for training pilots. Chrysler purchased the proving grounds in November 2007 from Ford for $34.9 million.

Yucca became part of Route 66 in 1952 when the highway was realigned, bypassing Oatman, Arizona. This was the heyday for the small town when motels, cafés, and a Whiting Brothers truck stop operated. In the early 1970s, Interstate 40 replaced the section of Route 66 going through Yucca. The motels and truck stop went out of business as people used facilities in larger Kingman and Needles. A small general store/café, post office, automotive service center, real estate office, and bar were the only retail businesses remaining by 2008.

Much of the land subsequently owned by the railroad was subdivided into typically  parcels and offered to the general public as the Stage Coach Trails development. This land has primarily been purchased by individuals for residential use or long term investment. Other smaller developments opened just north of Yucca in 2006. Over time these residential developments may spur renewed business growth in the area.

Location and climate 
Yucca has a hot desert climate (Köppen BWh) with brutally hot summers and cool winters. In summer, it is normal to record temperatures above  for days on end, while in winter it is very mild with practically no snowfall: the highest rainfall in a month is merely . The average minimum temperatures in the winter are usually . The sun shines throughout the spring and early summer, and most of the limited rain falls from extratropical lows in the cooler months.

Demographics

See also 
 Hualapai people
 Mohave people
 Bullhead City, Arizona
 Kingman, Arizona
 Lake Havasu City, Arizona
 Chloride, Arizona
 Santa Claus, Arizona

References 

Census-designated places in Mohave County, Arizona
Census-designated places in Arizona
Unincorporated communities in Mohave County, Arizona
Populated places established in the 1880s
Unincorporated communities in Arizona